Sphingicampa bisecta, the bisected honey locust moth, is a species of moth in the family Saturniidae (giant silkworm and royal moths). The species was described by Joseph Albert Lintner in 1879. It is found in North America.

The MONA or Hodges number for Sphingicampa bisecta is 7712.

References

Further reading
 Arnett, Ross H. (2000). American Insects: A Handbook of the Insects of America North of Mexico. CRC Press.
 Hodges, Ronald W.; et al., eds. (1983). Check List of the Lepidoptera of America North of Mexico, xxiv + 284.
 Tuskes, Paul M.; Tuttle, James P.; & Collins, Michael M. (1996). The Wild Silk Moths of North America: A Natural History of the Saturniidae of the United States and Canada, ix + 250.

External links
Butterflies and Moths of North America

Ceratocampinae
Moths described in 1879
Taxa named by Joseph Albert Lintner